Štěpánka Mertová (11 December 1930 – 20 September 2004) was a Czech athlete. She competed in the women's discus throw at the 1956 Summer Olympics and the 1960 Summer Olympics.

References

External links
 

1930 births
2004 deaths
Athletes (track and field) at the 1956 Summer Olympics
Athletes (track and field) at the 1960 Summer Olympics
Czech female discus throwers
Olympic athletes of Czechoslovakia
People from Šumperk District
Sportspeople from the Olomouc Region